PAV can stand for:
 Personal Air Vehicle
 Parallel Access Volumes
 Parental Age Verification
 Air suction valve: also known as a PAV, Pulsed Air Valve
 Proportional approval voting
 Permanent absentee voting

Pav can stand for:
 Pavlova (food)
 Pavo (constellation) (standard astronomical abbreviation)
 Pav, a type of Indian bread roll

People 
 Matthew Pavlich (born 1981), Australian rules footballer; games record holder and former captain of the Fremantle Football Club
 Roman Pavlyuchenko (born 1981), Association footballer, a Russian international currently playing for FC Lokomotiv Moscow
 Pav., taxonomic author abbreviation of José Antonio Pavón Jiménez (1754–1840), Spanish botanist

See also
 
 
 Pave (disambiguation)
 Pau (disambiguation)
 Pao (disambiguation)